Wrath of the Gods is a 1994 adventure-style computer game. It makes use of digitised backgrounds and sprites. The story is based on concepts and characters from Greek mythology. Billboard called it "a landmark effort in the realm of live-action games."

The game is played from the point of view of a young royal child who is prophesied to take his parents' kingdom. He is abandoned to the wolves on a mountainside, but is discovered by the centaur Chiron and raised by him. When the character is grown, Chiron gives the young man a ring that was found in his baby blankets and a few gems and then sends him out into the world.

The game is played from a two-dimensional perspective, and the player moves by clicking in the appropriate direction. Throughout the adventures, the player meets  characters from Greek mythology. Billboard noted its "high quality visuals, seamless effects and wealth of interactive features".

The game also features educational component where the player can view images of Greek art and learn about Greek mythology and history.

Reception
In April 1994 Computer Gaming World said that Wrath of the Gods offered "hours and hours of enjoyment" for fans of Ray Harryhausen's Jason and the Argonauts and others. The magazine stated that unlike other multimedia titles it "is interactive enough to play like a game, yet still retains a cinematic feel", with good acting, a "solid story line", and hints for those unfamiliar with Greek myth. Despite lacking fast travel, the magazine concluded that "Wrath of the Gods is a fun and educational adventure for both the seasoned and novice player. Luminaria has blended a fine mix of hip history, challenging game play, and quality presentation".

References

External links
 Official website

1994 video games
Adventure games
Classic Mac OS games
Windows games
Video games with digitized sprites
Video games set in antiquity
Video games based on Greek mythology
Video games developed in the United States
Maxis games